José Horacio Jaunarena (born 29 November 1942) is an Argentine politician who served as minister of defense of Raúl Alfonsín.

References

Defense ministers of Argentina
Radical Civic Union politicians
Living people
1942 births
Place of birth missing (living people)